Leirsund is a village in the municipality of Skedsmo, Norway. Its population (2005) is 1,177, of which 83 people live within the border of the neighboring municipality Sørum.

Villages in Akershus
Skedsmo